Brown Book may refer to:

 Brown Book (album), a 1987 album by Death In June
 Brown Book (document), created by the government in Manitoba, Canada, containing suggested fines for various offences
  The Brown Book (Wittgenstein) (1934–1935), a set of lecture notes by Ludwig Wittgenstein
 The Brown Book of the Reichstag Fire and Hitler Terror, a 1933 book by  Otto Katz
 Brown Book - War and Nazi Criminals in West Germany, or Braunbuch, a 1965 book by Albert Norden

See also
 Little Brown Book Group